Dolichognatha mapia is a species of spiders in the family Tetragnathidae, found in Brazil.

References

Tetragnathidae
Spiders described in 2001
Spiders of Brazil